Lamia Chafei Seghaier (born 4 May 1968 in Tunis) is a Tunisian engineer and politician. She was the Secretary of State to the Minister of Communication Technologies in charge of Information Technology, Internet and Free Software between 2008 and 2011.

Education 
Seghaier earned a master's degree in electrical engineering from National School of Engineering, Monastir and University of Technology of Compiègne.

Career 
In 1993, Seghaier became a network engineer in a private company, and then in 1996 she began working at the Tunisian Internet Agency, where she was successively Head of Service in charge of e-commerce, Deputy Director in charge of Technology and Security, and then Director in charge of Technology.

Seghaier became CEO, replacing Adel Gaaloul, and held this position from September 2007 to 2 January 2008.

Seghaier also helped develop some university courses, from 2000 to 2002,.

Between January 2008 and January 2011, 
Seghaier was Secretary of State to the Minister of Communication Technologies in charge of Information Technology, Internet and Free Software. She held this position in the first Ghannouchi government, and then with Minister Mohamed Naceur Ammar, from 2010 and until the 2011 revolution.

Personal life 
Seghaier is married and has one child.

References 

1968 births
Living people
Tunisian women engineers
People from Tunis
21st-century women engineers